John Bryant Paine (April 19, 1870 in Boston, Massachusetts – August 1, 1951 in Weston, Massachusetts) was an American shooter.  He competed at the 1896 Summer Olympics in Athens.

Paine was the son of Charles Jackson Paine who was a general in the Union Army during the American Civil War, and also was the younger brother to Sumner Paine.  He graduated from Harvard College.

Paine was a member of the Boston Athletic Association, the association were sending over members to Athens for the 1896 Summer Olympics, Paine decided to go along but first stopped in Paris to convince his brother Sumner to join him.

Paine entered all three of the pistol events at the 1896 Games, but actually competed in only one.  He, along with his brother Sumner Paine, was disqualified from the rapid fire pistol event for not having the appropriate caliber pistol.  Both of the Paines used Colt revolvers, firearms that were far superior to those used by their opponents in the 25 metre military pistol event, John won the event easily, scoring 442 points on 25 hits out of 30 shots, Sumner was not far behind, at 380 points on 23 hits; the third-place finisher, the Greek Nikolaos Morakis, scored only 205 points.

Paine then withdrew from the 30 metre free pistol event, citing his desire to not embarrass his Greek hosts. He also said he had an agreement with his brother that whoever won the first event between them would drop out the next event.

After the Olympics, Paine went on to fight in the Spanish–American War before returning to Boston, Massachusetts, and becoming a wealthy investment banker.

Paine is also the great-grandfather of Cècile Tucker who competed in 1996 Summer Olympics in a rowing event.

References

External links

1870 births
1951 deaths
Shooters at the 1896 Summer Olympics
19th-century sportsmen
Olympic gold medalists for the United States in shooting
American male sport shooters
ISSF pistol shooters
Olympic medalists in shooting
Medalists at the 1896 Summer Olympics
Harvard College alumni
19th-century American people
20th-century American people
Sportspeople from Boston